Saranina is a rural locality (a village) in Beloyevskoye Rural Settlement, Kudymkarsky District, Perm Krai, Russia. The population was 39 as of 2010.

Geography 
Saranina is located 19 km northwest of Kudymkar (the district's administrative centre) by road. Pruddor is the nearest rural locality.

References 

Rural localities in Kudymkarsky District